Trond Eliassen (born 10 October 1922) is a Norwegian architect.

He was born in Kristiania to architect Georg Eliassen and artist Helfrid Beda Andrea Strömberg, and is a brother of metrologist Arnt Eliassen. In 1947 he started an architectural company jointly with Birger Lambertz-Nilssen. Their designs include the county hospitals of Vest-Agder, Aust-Agder and Telemark, the Sandefjord town hall, and the Norwegian Maritime Museum. Eliassen was decorated Knight, First Class of the Order of St. Olav in 1983.

References

1922 births
Living people
Architects from Oslo